Martiros of Crimea or Martiros Ghrimetsi (Armenian: Մարտիրոս Ղրիմեցի) was an Armenian writer, poet, historian and a priest of the 17th century. He is well known for his satirical work.

Martiros of Crimea has left a number of poems, which are considered to be a part of the Armenian cultural heritage. He has also written a book about the history of the Armenians in Crimea, which is a significant historical source.

References 

Date of birth unknown
Place of birth unknown
Date of death unknown
Place of death unknown
Armenian priests
17th-century Armenian poets
Armenian male poets
17th-century male writers